Bradford Knapp (December 24, 1870 – June 11, 1938) was the President of the Alabama Polytechnic Institute, now known as Auburn University from 1928 to 1933.

Biography
Bradford Knapp was born in Vinton, Iowa, on December 24, 1870, to Seaman A. Knapp. In 1899, he attended Iowa State College and graduated with a B.A. in chemistry from Vanderbilt University in 1892. In 1894, he attended Georgetown University and received a B.L. from the University of Michigan in 1896. In 1909, he worked as an assistant for his father in the Bureau of Plant Industry of the United States Department of Agriculture. From 1911 to 1915, he took up his father's position as Chief of Farm Demonstration Work. In 1915, he became Chief of Southern Extension Work for the States Relations Service of the USDA.

In 1920, he became Dean of the College of Agriculture at the University of Arkansas. From 1923 to 1928, he served as President of the Oklahoma Agricultural and Mechanical College. He served as the President of the Alabama Polytechnic Institute, now known as Auburn University from 1928 to 1933, of Texas Technological College from 1933 to 1938. At Tech, he enlisted assistance from several New Deal programs to build dormitories, pave streets, add a golf course and swimming pool, and to revitalize and landscape the campus, located on a semi-arid steppe. Knapp Hall is named in his honor.

He served on the National Council of Boy Scouts, the federal Farm Board, and the National Economic League. He wrote for the Progressive Farmer.

References

External links
 
Papers, 1891-1940 and undated, in the Southwest Collection/Special Collections Library at Texas Tech University
Papers, 1856-1931, of his father Seaman Knapp in the Southwest Collection/Special Collections Library at Texas Tech University

1870 births
1938 deaths
People from Vinton, Iowa
Iowa State University alumni
Vanderbilt University alumni
Georgetown University alumni
University of Michigan Law School alumni
University of Arkansas faculty
Oklahoma State University faculty
Presidents of Oklahoma State University
American agricultural writers
American male non-fiction writers
Presidents of Auburn University
Presidents of Texas Tech University